Gangzha District was a district of Nantong, Jiangsu province, China. The district has an area of 134 km2 and in 2001 the population was around 180,000.

Gangzha District was merged into Chongchuan District in July 2020.

Administrative divisions
Before being merged into Chongchuan District in July 2020, Gangzha District has 6 subdistricts.
6 subdistricts

References

County-level divisions of Jiangsu
Nantong